John Thomas Taylor (1877–1951) was a rugby union international who represented England from 1897 to 1905, and at club level for Castleford RUFC and West Hartlepool R.F.C. He also captained his country.

Early life
John Taylor was born on 26 May 1877 in Whitwood Mere, Castleford, Yorkshire.

Rugby union career
Taylor made his international debut on 6 February 1897 at Lansdowne Road in the Ireland vs England match.
Of the 11 matches he played for his national side he was on the winning side on 3 occasions.
He played his final match for England on 18 March 1905 at Athletic Ground, Richmond in the England vs Scotland match.

References

1877 births
1951 deaths
England international rugby union players
English rugby union players
Rugby union centres
West Hartlepool R.F.C. players
Castleford R.U.F.C. players
Durham County RFU players
Rugby union players from Castleford